NA-138 Okara-IV is a constituency for the National Assembly of Pakistan.

Members of Parliament

2018-2022: NA-144 (Okara-IV)

Election 2002 

General elections were held on 10 Oct 2002. Rubina Shaheen Watoo of PML-J won by 70,744 votes.

Election 2008 

General elections were held on 18 Feb 2008. Mian Manzoor Ahmad Khan Wattoo an Independent candidate won by 84,778 votes.

Election 2013 

General elections were held on 11 May 2013. Muhammad Moeen Wattoo of PML-N won by 87,266 votes and became the  member of National Assembly.

Election 2018 

General elections were held on 25 July 2018.

See also
NA-137 Okara-III
NA-139 Pakpattan-I

References

External links 
 Election result's official website

NA-147